Vijay Kumar Rajbhar is an Indian politician. He was elected to the Uttar Pradesh Legislative Assembly from Ghosi in the 2019 by election as a member of the Bharatiya Janata Party. By-election happened due to Phagu Chauhan being appointed Governor of Bihar.

References

Living people
Bharatiya Janata Party politicians from Uttar Pradesh
People from Mau district
Uttar Pradesh MLAs 2017–2022
Year of birth missing (living people)